Nanocambridgea is a monotypic genus of intertidal spiders containing the single species, Nanocambridgea gracilipes. It was first described by Raymond Robert Forster & C. L. Wilton in 1973, and is found on New Zealand. Originally placed with the Stiphidiidae, it was moved to the Desidae after a 2017 genetic study. A male described as N. grandis in 2000 was synonymized with Cambridgea reinga in 2011.

See also
 List of Desidae species

References

Desidae
Monotypic Araneomorphae genera
Spiders of New Zealand
Taxa named by Raymond Robert Forster